Eridachtha phaeochlora is a moth in the family Lecithoceridae. It was described by Edward Meyrick in 1920. It is found in Kenya.

References

Endemic moths of Kenya
Moths described in 1920
Eridachtha